Roche-Bois Warriors is a Mauritian basketball club based in the Roche-Bois, a suburb of Port Louis. The team plays in the MBBF Super League, the highest level of basketball in Mauritius. 

Established in 2000, the Warriors won their first-ever national championship in 2020, after defeating Mahebourg Flippers in the finals. As a result, the Warriors qualified for the 2022 qualifying tournaments of the Basketball Africa League (BAL) for the first time. This marked the first international appearance of the Warriors.

Players

Current roster

In the Basketball Africa League

References

Basketball teams in Mauritius
Basketball teams established in 2000
Road to BAL teams